The LHCb (Large Hadron Collider beauty) experiment is one of eight particle physics detector experiments collecting data at the Large Hadron Collider at CERN. LHCb is a specialized b-physics experiment, designed primarily to measure the parameters of CP violation in the interactions of b-hadrons (heavy particles containing a bottom quark). Such studies can help to explain the matter-antimatter asymmetry of the Universe. The detector is also able to perform measurements of production cross sections, exotic hadron spectroscopy, charm physics and electroweak physics in the forward region. The LHCb collaboration, who built, operate and analyse data from the experiment, is composed of approximately 1260 people from 74 scientific institutes, representing 16 countries. Chris Parkes succeeded on July 1, 2020 as spokesperson for the collaboration to Giovanni Passaleva (spokesperson 2017-2020). The experiment is located at point 8 on the LHC tunnel close to Ferney-Voltaire, France just over the border from Geneva. The (small) MoEDAL experiment shares the same cavern.

Physics goals 
The experiment has wide physics program covering many important aspects of heavy flavour (both beauty and charm), electroweak and quantum chromodynamics (QCD) physics. Six key measurements have been identified involving B mesons. These are described in a roadmap document that formed the core physics programme for the first high energy LHC running in 2010–2012. They include:
 Measuring the branching ratio of the rare Bs → μ+ μ− decay.
 Measuring the forward-backward asymmetry of the muon pair in the flavour-changing neutral current Bd → K* μ+ μ− decay. Such a flavour changing neutral current cannot occur at tree-level in the Standard Model of Particle Physics, and only occurs through box and loop Feynman diagrams; properties of the decay can be strongly modified by new physics.
 Measuring the CP violating phase in the decay Bs → J/ψ φ, caused by interference between the decays with and without Bs oscillations. This phase is one of the CP observables with the smallest theoretical uncertainty in the Standard Model, and can be significantly modified by new physics.
 Measuring properties of radiative B decays, i.e. B meson decays with photons in the final states. Specifically, these are again flavour-changing neutral current decays.
 Tree-level determination of the unitarity triangle angle γ.
 Charmless charged two-body B decays.

The LHCb detector 
The fact that the two b-hadrons are predominantly produced in the same forward cone is exploited in the layout of the LHCb detector. The LHCb detector is a single arm forward spectrometer with a polar angular coverage from 10 to 300 milliradians (mrad) in the horizontal and 250 mrad in the vertical plane. The asymmetry between the horizontal and vertical plane is determined by a large dipole magnet with the main field component in the vertical direction.

Subsystems 
The Vertex Locator (VELO) is built around the proton interaction region. It is used to measure the particle trajectories close to the interaction point in order to precisely separate primary and secondary vertices.

This implies an enormous flux of particles; VELO has been designed to withstand integrated fluences of more than 1014 p/cm2 per year for a period of about three years. The detector operates in vacuum and is cooled to approximately  using a biphase CO2 system. The data of the VELO detector are amplified and read out by the Beetle ASIC.

The RICH-1 detector (Ring imaging Cherenkov detector) is located directly after the vertex detector. It is used for particle identification of low-momentum tracks.

The main tracking system is placed before and after the dipole magnet. It is used to reconstruct the trajectories of charged particles and to measure their momenta. The tracker consists of three subdetectors:

 The Tracker Turicensis, a silicon strip detector located before the LHCb dipole magnet
 The Outer Tracker. A straw-tube based detector located after the dipole magnet covering the outer part of the detector acceptance
 The Inner Tracker, silicon strip based detector located after the dipole magnet covering the inner part of the detector acceptance
Following the tracking system is RICH-2. It allows the identification of the particle type of high-momentum tracks.

The electromagnetic and hadronic calorimeters provide measurements of the energy of electrons, photons, and hadrons. These measurements are used at trigger level to identify the particles with large transverse momentum (high-Pt particles).

The muon system is used to identify and trigger on muons in the events.

LHCb upgrade (2019–2021) 
At the end of 2018, the LHC was shut down for upgrades, with a restart currently planned for early 2022. For the LHCb detector, almost all subdetectors are to be modernised or replaced. It will get a fully new tracking system composed of a modernised vertex locator, upstream tracker (UT) and scintillator fibre tracker (SciFi). The RICH detectors will also be updated, as well as the whole detector electronics. However, the most important change is the switch to the fully software trigger of the experiment, which means that every recorded collision will be analysed by sophisticated software programmes without an intermediate hardware filtering step (which was found to be a bottleneck in the past).

Results 
During the 2011 proton-proton run, LHCb recorded an integrated luminosity of 1 fb−1 at a collision energy of 7 TeV. In 2012, about 2 fb−1 was collected at an energy of 8 TeV. During 2015-2018 (Run 2 of the LHC), about 6 fb−1 was collected at a center-of-mass energy of 13 TeV. In addition, small samples were collected in proton-lead, lead-lead, and xenon-xenon collisions. The LHCb design also allowed the study of collisions of particle beams with a gas (helium or neon) injected inside the VELO volume, making it similar to a fixed-target experiment; this setup is usually referred to as "SMOG". These datasets allow the collaboration to carry out the physics programme of precision Standard Model tests with many additional measurements. As of 2021, LHCb has published more than 500 scientific papers.

Hadron spectroscopy 
LHCb is designed to study beauty and charm hadrons. In addition to precision studies of the known particles such as mysterious X(3872), a number of new hadrons have been discovered by the experiment. As of 2021, all four LHC experiments have discovered about 60 new hadrons in total, vast majority of which by LHCb. In 2015, analysis of the decay of bottom lambda baryons (Λ) in the LHCb experiment revealed the apparent existence of pentaquarks, in what was described as an "accidental" discovery. Other notable discoveries are those of the "doubly charmed" baryon  in 2017, being a first known baryon with two heavy quarks; and of the fully-charmed tetraquark  in 2020, made of two charm quarks and two charm antiquarks.

CP violation and mixing 
Studies of charge-parity (CP) violation in B-meson decays is the primary design goal of the LHCb experiment. As of 2021, LHCb measurements confirm with a remarkable precision the picture described by the CKM unitarity triangle. The angle  of the unitarity triangle is now known to about 4°, and is in agreement with indirect determinations.

In 2019, LHCb announced discovery of CP violation in decays of charm mesons. This is the first time CP violation is seen in decays of particles other than kaons or B mesons. The rate of the observed CP asymmetry is at the upper edge of existing theoretical predictions, which triggered some interest among particle theorists regarding possible impact of physics beyond the Standard Model.

In 2020, LHCb announced discovery of time-dependent CP violation in decays of Bs mesons.  The oscillation frequency of Bs mesons to its antiparticle and vice versa was measured to a great precision in 2021.

Rare decays 
Rare decays are the decay modes harshly suppressed in the Standard Model, which makes them sensitive to potential effects from yet unknown physics mechanisms.

In 2014, LHCb and CMS experiments published a joint paper in Nature announcing the discovery of the very rare decay , rate of which was found close to the Standard Model predictions. This measurement has harshly limited the possible parameter space of supersymmetry theories, which have predicted a large enhancement in rate. Since then, LHCb has published several papers with more precise measurements in this decay mode.

Anomalies were found in several rare decays of B mesons. The most famous example in the so-called  angular observable was found in the decay , where the deviation between the data and theoretical prediction has persisted for years. The decay rates of several rare decays also differ from the theoretical predictions, though the latter have sizeable uncertainties.

Lepton flavour universality 

In the Standard Model, couplings of charged leptons (electron, muon and tau lepton) to the gauge bosons are expected to be identical, with the only difference emerging from the lepton masses. This postulate is referred to as "lepton flavour universality". As a consequence, in decays of b hadrons, electrons and muons should be produced at similar rates, and the small difference due to the lepton masses is precisely calculable.

However, as the decays in question are very rare, a larger dataset needs to be analysed in order to make definitive conclusions.

In March 2021, LHCb announced that the anomaly in lepton universality crossed the "3 sigma" statistical significance threshold, which translates to a p-value of 0.1%. In December 2022 improved measurements discarded this anomaly.

Other measurements 
LHCb has contributed to studies of quantum chromodynamics, electroweak physics, and provided cross-section measurements for astroparticle physics.

See also

B-factory
Belle II experiment

References

External links

LHCb Public Webpage
LHCb section from US/LHC Website
  (Full design documentation)
 LHCb experiment record on INSPIRE-HEP

CERN experiments
Particle experiments
Large Hadron Collider
B physics